Oxygen is a chemical element with symbol O and atomic number 8.

Oxygen may also refer to:

Computing 
 Oxygen XML Editor
 Oxygen Games, a defunct video game developer
 Oxygen Project, a theme set for KDE Plasma Workspaces
 OxygenOS, an Android-based OS for OnePlus smartphones

Film and television
 Oxygen (1999 film), an American crime thriller by Richard Shepard
 Oxygen: Custom Concert, a 2004 concert film by Ashanti
 Oxygen (2009 film), a Russian drama film
 Oxygen (2010 film), a Belgian-Dutch film
 Oxygen (2017 film), an Indian Telugu action film
 Oxygen (2020 film), a Bangladeshi short film
 Oxygen (2021 film), a French-language science fiction film
 Oxygen (TV channel), an American television network
 "Oxygen" (Doctor Who), a television episode

Literature
 Oxygen (Miller novel), a 2001 novel by Andrew Miller
 Oxygen (Olson and Ingermanson novel), a 2001 novel by John B. Olson and Randall S. Ingermanson
 Oxygen (play), a 2001 play by Carl Djerassi and Roald Hoffmann
 Oxygen (magazine), a women's magazine published by Outside Inc.

Music 
 Oxygen Music Works, an Anglo-American record label

Albums 
 Oxygen (Avalon album), 2001
 Oxygen (Baptiste Giabiconi album) or the title song, 2012
 Oxygen (Lincoln Brewster album) or the title song, 2014
 Oxygen (Varga album), 1996
 Oxygen (Wild Orchid album), 1998
 Oxygen: Inhale, by Thousand Foot Krutch, or the title song, 2014
 Oxygen (Swans EP) or the title song, 2014
 Oxygen, an EP by Austin Mahone, 2018

Songs 
"Oxygen" (Hadouken! song), 2010
"Oxygen" (Marie Serneholt song), 2006
"Oxygen" (Winona Oak and Robin Schulz song), 2020
"Oxygen", by Bryan Adams from 11, 2008
"Oxygen", by Catfish and the Bottlemen from The Ride, 2016
"Oxygen", by Colbie Caillat from Coco, 2007
"Oxygen", by Dirty Heads from Dirty Heads, 2016
"Oxygen", by Elaine Paige from Love Can Do That, 1991
"Oxygen", by Feeder from Echo Park, 2001
"Oxygen", by Hoku from Hoku, 2000
"Oxygen", by Jesse McCartney from Departure, 2008
"Oxygen", by JJ72 from JJ72, 2000
"Oxygen", by Maia Mitchell from the Teen Beach Movie soundtrack, 2013
"Oxygen", by New Found Glory from Coming Home, 2006
"Oxygen", by Opshop from You Are Here, 2004
"Oxygen", by Soul Asylum from The Silver Lining, 2006
"Oxygen", by Spice Girls from Forever, 2000
"Oxygen", by Steffany Gretzinger from Blackout, 2018
"Oxygen", by Swans from To Be Kind, 2014
"Oxygen", by Twelve Foot Ninja from Outlier, 2016
"Oxygen", by Twice from More & More, 2020
"Oxygen", by Willy Mason from Where the Humans Eat, 2004
"Oxygen", by Zion I from Break a Dawn, 2006

Other uses 
 Bottled oxygen (climbing), oxygen use in mountaineering 
 Oxygen (horse) (1828–1854/1855), a British Thoroughbred racehorse
 Oxygen Park, a public park in Education City, Doha, Qatar
 Oxygen SpA, an Italian electric scooter company
 Oxygen Towers, residential towers in Manchester, England

See also

 
 
 Oxegen, a 2004–2011 music festival in Ireland
 Oxigen Services, an Indian financial technology company
 Oxygene (disambiguation)
 O (disambiguation)